The Danish national men's ice hockey team is the national ice hockey team for Denmark. The team is controlled by Danmarks Ishockey Union. It was founded in 1949, and as of 2022, the Danish team was ranked 10th in the IIHF World Rankings. Denmark currently has 4,255 players (0.07% of its population). Their coach is Danish Heinz Ehlers who replaced Janne Karlsson. Denmark once held the record for the largest loss when they were defeated by Canada in 1949, 47–0, only being surpassed by New Zealand who were defeated by Australia 58–0 in 1987.

History
The team played its first world championship in 1949, led by player-coach and captain Jørgen Hviid. After not qualifying for a world championship since 1949, Denmark surprised many in 2003 by finishing in 11th place, including a tie game against that year's champions Canada.

In 2003, Denmark was back in the elite pool of the IIHF World Championships after 54 years. The Danish national hockey team scored two historic, unexpected upsets in Tampere, Finland, defeating the United States 5–2 on 26 April 2003 and tied Canada 2–2 six days later on 2 May 2003. Denmark has remained in the top division ever since. At the 2010 World Championships Denmark finished 8th place, which is their best ever placing to date. The feat was repeated in 2016.

Tournament record

Olympic Games

World Championship

Team

Current roster
Roster for the 2022 IIHF World Championship.

Head coach: Heinz Ehlers

Current top players

Former and current players in NHL
Players from Denmark who have played in the NHL

NHL Drafts
Players from Denmark to be drafted in the NHL

All-time record against other nations
Updated 16 February 2022.

Uniform evolution

References

External links

IIHF profile

 
National ice hockey teams in Europe